Cavecraft is the fifth and final studio album by American punk band Babyland, released on September 19, 2008 by Mattress Recordings.

Track listing

Personnel 
Adapted from the Cavecraft liner notes.

Babyland
 Dan Gatto – lead vocals, keyboards, programming
 Michael Smith – percussion, programming

Production and design
 Babyland – production, mixing
 Giuliana Maresca – cover art, photography
 Larry Goetz – production, recording, mastering

Release history

References

External links 
 
 Cavecraft at iTunes

2008 albums
Babyland albums
Metropolis Records albums